Adrián Alejandro Zambrano Rondón (born 21 May 2000) is a Venezuelan footballer who plays as a defender for Venezuelan Primera División side Zulia FC.

Club career
Zambrano made his senior debut in a 2–2 league draw with Petare.

Career statistics

Club

References

1999 births
Living people
Venezuelan footballers
Association football defenders
Zulia F.C. players
Venezuelan Primera División players
People from Maracaibo
Sportspeople from Maracaibo